Francesco Ripa may refer to:
Francesco Ripa (footballer born 1974), goalkeeper
Francesco Ripa (footballer born 1985), forward

See also
San Francesco a Ripa
Ripa (surname)